Roberto Bautista Agut defeated the defending champion Nikoloz Basilashvili in a rematch of the  previous year's final, 6–3, 6–4 to win the singles title at the 2022 Qatar Open.

Seeds 
The top four seeds received a bye into the second round.

Draw

Finals

Top half

Bottom half

Qualifying

Seeds

Qualifiers

Lucky losers

Qualifying draw

First qualifier

Second qualifier

Third qualifier

Fourth qualifier

References

External links
Main draw
Qualifying draw

Qatar ExxonMobil Open - 1
Qatar Open (tennis)